Helsinki Group may refer to several human rights organizations:

 International Helsinki Federation for Human Rights and its successor Helsinki Committee for Human Rights
 British Helsinki Human Rights Group
 Commission on Security and Cooperation in Europe also known as U.S. Helsinki Commission
 Helsinki Watch, a U.S. non-governmental organization, predecessor of Human Rights Watch
 In the former Soviet Union:
 Moscow Helsinki Group (1976–present)
 Ukrainian Helsinki Group (1976–81)
 Lithuanian Helsinki Group (1976–82)
 Georgian Helsinki Union (1976–93), part of Round Table—Free Georgia

See also
Helsinki Commission (disambiguation)